Robert Kenneth Kraft (born June 5, 1941) is an American billionaire businessman. He is the chairman and chief executive officer (CEO) of the Kraft Group, a diversified holding company with assets in paper and packaging, sports and entertainment, real estate development, and a private equity portfolio. Since 1994, he has owned the New England Patriots of National Football League (NFL). Kraft also owns the New England Revolution of Major League Soccer (MLS), which he founded in 1996, and the esport-based Boston Uprising, which he founded in 2017.  he has a net worth of $10.6 billion.

Early life and education
Kraft was born in Brookline, Massachusetts, the son of Sarah Bryna (Webber) and Harry Kraft, a dress manufacturer in Boston's Chinatown. His mother was born in Halifax, Nova Scotia; his father was a lay leader at Congregation Kehillath Israel in Brookline and wanted his son to become a rabbi. The Krafts were a Modern Orthodox Jewish family. Robert attended the Edward Devotion School and graduated from Brookline High School. As a child, he sold newspapers outside of Braves Field in Boston. During high school, he was unable to participate in most sports because it interfered with his after-school Hebrew studies and observance of the Sabbath.

Kraft attended Columbia University on an academic scholarship and he served as class president. He played tennis and safety on the school's freshman and lightweight football teams. During that time, he also lived in Carman Hall. He met Myra Hiatt at a delicatessen in Boston's Back Bay in 1962, and they married in June 1963. He graduated from Columbia that same year, and he received an MBA from Harvard Business School in 1965.

Kraft was elected chairman of the Newton Democratic City Committee when he was 27. He considered running against Representative Philip J. Philbin in 1970 but chose not to, citing the loss of privacy and strain on his family that politics would have caused. He was further discouraged from entering politics by the suicide of his friend State Representative H. James Shea, Jr.

Business career
Kraft began his professional career with the Rand-Whitney Group, a Worcester-based packaging company run by his father-in-law Jacob Hiatt. In 1968, he gained control of the company through a leveraged buyout. He still serves as this company's chairman. In 1972, he founded International Forest Products, a trader of physical paper commodities. The two combined companies make up the largest privately held paper and packaging companies in the United States. Kraft has stated that he started the company out of a hunch that the increase in international communications and transportation would lead to an expansion of global trade in the late twentieth century.

International Forest Products became a top 100 US exporter/importer in 1997 and in 2001 was ranked No. 7 on the Journal of Commerce's list in that category. Kraft said of the business in 1991 that, "We do things for a number of companies, including Avon, Kodak, cosmetics companies, candies, toys." The company produced both corrugated and folding cartons, which he stated, "are used to package everything from the Patriot missile, to mints, to Estee Lauder, Indiana Glass and Polaroid." Kraft acquired interests in other areas, and ultimately formed the Kraft Group as an umbrella for them in 1998.

Kraft was an investor in New England Television Corp., which gained control of the channel 7 license for Boston in 1982, and Kraft became a director of the board a year later, after the newly licensed station, WNEV-TV, signed on, replacing the former WNAC-TV. In 1986, he was named president of the corporation. In 1991, Kraft exercised his option to sell his shares for an estimated $25 million.

Sports ownership

Boston Lobsters 
In 1974, Kraft and five others purchased the Boston Lobsters of World TeamTennis (WTT). The group spent heavily to lure a number of top players, including Martina Navratilova, and the Lobsters became one of the best teams in WTT. Following the 1978 season, Kraft announced that the franchise would fold. The league itself folded soon thereafter.

After the Lobsters folded, Kraft was also mentioned as a bidder for the Boston Red Sox and the Boston Celtics.

American football

Kraft has been a Patriots fan since their American Football League days and has been a season ticket holder since 1971 when the team moved to Schaefer Stadium. In 1985, he bought a 10-year option on Foxboro Raceway, a horse track adjacent to the stadium, and the purchase prevented Patriots owner Billy Sullivan from holding non-Patriot events at the stadium while races were being held. Kraft took advantage of the fact that the Sullivans owned the stadium but not the surrounding land, and it was the beginning of a quest to buy the stadium and the Patriots. Sullivan's family was reeling from a series of bad investments, principally The Jackson Five 1984 Victory Tour, for which they had to pledge Sullivan Stadium as collateral. Those problems ultimately forced Sullivan to sell controlling interest of the team in 1988, while the stadium lapsed into bankruptcy.

In 1988, Kraft outbid several competitors to buy the stadium out of bankruptcy court from Sullivan for $22 million. The stadium was considered to be outdated and nearly worthless, but the purchase included the stadium's lease to the Patriots which ran through 2001. Kraft placed a bid on the Patriots franchise as well, but he lost the bidding to Victor Kiam. Sullivan and Kiam then tried to move the team to Jacksonville, but Kraft refused to let them break the lease. Kiam was nearly brought down by bad investments of his own and was forced to sell the Patriots to James Orthwein in 1992.

In 1994, Orthwein offered Kraft $75 million to buy out the remainder of the team's lease at Foxboro Stadium, but Kraft turned it down. Orthwein was not interested in operating the team in New England and decided to sell it. Prospective buyers had to deal with Kraft, however, due to terms in the operating covenant, and he offered $172 million for an outright purchase which Orthwein accepted. It was the highest price ever paid for an NFL team at the time. While future St. Louis/Los Angeles Rams owner Stan Kroenke had actually offered more money ($200 million), Orthwein would have had to bear all of the team's relocation expenses. Orthwein would have also been responsible for paying the costs of an all-but-certain legal battle over the lease, as Kraft let it be known that he would go to court to enforce the covenant.

Kraft said that his passion for the Patriots led him to "break every one of my financial rules" in his pursuit of the team. Indeed, he still believes he "overpaid" for the franchise. He still keeps a Victory Tour poster in his office as a reminder of what set in motion the events that allowed him to buy the Patriots. Following the NFL's approval of the sale, the Patriots sold out their entire 1994 season, the first full sell-out in franchise history. Every Patriots home game–preseason, regular season, and playoffs–has been sold out ever since.

In 1998, Kraft considered moving the Patriots to Hartford, Connecticut based on an offer that the state of Connecticut would finance a new stadium, but he terminated the deal just before it became binding to instead build a new stadium in Foxboro with Massachusetts infrastructure funding. In 2002, Kraft financed a $350-million stadium for the Patriots initially called CMGI Field but renamed Gillette Stadium. In 2007, Kraft began to develop the land around Gillette Stadium, creating a $375-million open-air shopping and entertainment center called Patriot Place. The development included "The Hall at Patriot Place presented by Raytheon," a multi-story museum and hall of fame attached to the stadium, and the "CBS Scene," a CBS-themed restaurant.

On January 27, 2000, Kraft traded a first round draft pick to the New York Jets for the rights to hire Bill Belichick as head coach. The trade was met with criticism at the time, but proved to be successful after Belichick led the Patriots to win six Super Bowl championships and nine conference and 16 division titles. In 2000, the Patriots drafted quarterback Tom Brady, who would be the team's starter from 2001 to 2019. The relationship between Kraft, Belichick and Brady has been credited with producing one of the most successful sports dynasties in football, although in later years the personal relationship between the three men grew strained.

Under Kraft's ownership, the Patriots experienced sustained success for the first time in franchise history. While they appeared in Super Bowl XX under the Sullivans, this was one of only six playoff appearances in 34 years. Indeed, that Super Bowl season saw only the second playoff win in franchise history. However, they have made the playoffs 21 times in Kraft's 27 years as owner. They have won 19 AFC East titles, including all but three since 2001 and 11 in a row from 2009 to 2019. They represented the AFC in the Super Bowl in 1996 (lost), 2001 (won), 2003 (won), 2004 (won), 2007 (lost), 2011 (lost), 2014 (won), 2016 (won), 2017 (lost) and 2018 (won). After having never won more than 11 games prior to Kraft's arrival, the Patriots have won at least 12 games 14 times, including finishing the 2007 regular season undefeated before losing to the New York Giants in Super Bowl XLII.

Indianapolis Colts center Jeff Saturday, referring to Kraft's role in helping to settle the NFL lockout before the 2011 season, said "He [Kraft] is a man who helped us save football."

In 2005, during a visit to Saint Petersburg, Kraft gave Russian President Vladimir Putin his third Super Bowl ring. He released a statement some days after the visit claiming that it was a gift out of "respect and admiration" for the Russian people and Putin's leadership. Kraft later said that he did not originally intend to give the ring as a gift and that his statement had been issued under pressure from the White House after Putin had kept the ring. The ring is on display with state gifts at the Kremlin.

Former Patriot Ryan O'Callaghan wrote in his book that Kraft supported him when he publicly came out as gay in 2017. According to O'Callaghan, Kraft invited him to a reception and said, "What you did took a lot of courage. I'm so proud of you" and that he would be "forever a Patriot".

Soccer
In 1996, Kraft founded the New England Revolution, a charter member of Major League Soccer which began playing alongside the Patriots at Foxboro Stadium. Kraft also owned the San Jose Clash (later San Jose Earthquakes) from 1998 to 2000.

In November 2005, Kraft met with Rick Parry, the Chief Executive of English Premier League team Liverpool. Kraft was rumored to be interested in investing money into the 2004–05 Champions League winners. Kraft told BBC Radio 5 Live: "Liverpool is a great brand and it's something our family respects a lot. We're always interested in opportunities and growing, so you never know what can happen." Eventually, however, the club was sold to American duo George Gillett and Tom Hicks. Liverpool is now owned by Fenway Sports Group, owners of fellow Boston-based sport team the Boston Red Sox.

In October 2017, Kraft said he was "still intrigued" by the possibility of buying a Premier League football club, but that he was concerned about the lack of a salary cap in British football.

In 2017, Kraft was named the Honorary Chairman of the board of directors for the successful joint Canadian-Mexican-American bid for the 2026 FIFA World Cup.

In 2019, Kraft hired Bruce Arena as head coach and sporting director of the New England Revolution. In 2020, the team had their first playoff win in six years.

Esports
Blizzard Entertainment announced in July 2017 that Kraft bought ownership in the Boston Uprising, one of the first seven teams for the professional esports Overwatch League. They played in Season 1 of the Overwatch League. Preseason for the league began December 6, 2017, and the regular season started on January 10, 2018. Boston Uprising finished third in the Overwatch League's inaugural season.

Kraft Foundation
The Krafts have donated hundreds of millions of dollars to philanthropic work including education, child- and women-related issues, healthcare, youth sports and American and Israeli causes. Among the many institutions the Krafts have supported are Columbia University, Harvard Business School, Brandeis University, The College of the Holy Cross, Boston College, Tufts University, Yeshiva University, the Belmont Hill School, and the Boys & Girls Clubs of Boston.

In 1989, Myra and Robert Kraft launched the Passport to Israel Fund, in collaboration with Center for Jewish Progress of Greater Boston (CJP), to help parents send their teenage children to Israel. One of their most distinctive projects is supporting American Football Israel, including Kraft Family Stadium in Jerusalem and the Kraft Family Israel Football League. In 1990, Kraft, his wife, and his father-in-law funded a joint professorship between Brandeis University and Holy Cross College, forming the Kraft-Hiatt endowed chairs in comparative religion – the first inter-religious endowed chairs in the United States.

In 2011, the Krafts pledged $20 million to Partners HealthCare to launch the Kraft Family National Center for Leadership and Training in Community Health, an initiative designed to improve access to quality healthcare at community health centers throughout New England. The Krafts supported the Dana–Farber Cancer Institute in Boston.

Philanthropy
In 2000, Kraft donated $11.5 million to construct the Columbia/Hillel which is made of the same white stone used in Jerusalem. In 2007, after a $5 million payment to Columbia's intercollegiate athletics program, the playing field at Columbia's Lawrence A. Wien Stadium at the Baker Field Athletics Complex was named Robert K. Kraft Field.

Following the Boston Marathon bombing, Kraft announced he would match up to $100,000 in donations made for the victims through the New England Patriots Charitable Foundation.

In 2017, Kraft announced a contribution of $6 million to build the first regulation size American football field in Israel. In June 2017, Robert Kraft, along with several NFL Hall of Famers, traveled to Israel for the grand opening of the new Kraft Family Sports Campus. Kraft has led additional "Touchdown in Israel" trips to Israel, with Patriots and Hall of Famers, since that 2017 trip. That same year, Kraft funded a new van as part of the Kraft Center for Community Health at Massachusetts General Hospital in order to help combat the opioid crisis in Boston. The vans allow those with opioid addiction to seek health services in their own neighborhoods.

In 2018, Kraft donated $10 million to CJP for the renovation of its headquarters in downtown Boston. In 2019, Kraft, along with Chelsea Football Club owner Roman Abramovich, hosted a soccer match between the New England Revolution and Chelsea F.C., called Final Whistle on Hate, to raise money to combat antisemitism. The match raised an estimated $4 million, with Kraft personally contributing $1 million toward the fund. Following Pittsburgh synagogue shooting at Tree of Life, Kraft visited the synagogue to pay his respects and attended services with the congregation before the Patriots played the Steelers in a game the next day.

In June 2019, Kraft received Israel's Genesis Prize. While at the event in Jerusalem, Kraft pledged $20 million to establish a foundation that will fight antisemitism and combat the Boycott, Divestment, and Sanctions (BDS) movement against Israel. The next month, Kraft pledged $100,000 to the families of seven motorcyclists killed in a crash the month before. He donated $20,000 and attended the memorial in Worcester to honor fallen firefighter Christopher Roy on the one-year anniversary of his death. Kraft teamed with recording artists Jay-Z and Meek Mill, as well as Michael G. Rubin, the executive chairman of Fanatics, among others to announce a foundation of criminal justice reform called REFORM Alliance. In coordination with the REFORM Alliance, Kraft invited more than 50 children (ages 5–17) to fly on the Patriots' team charter to attend the Patriots game against the Buffalo Bills at Gillette Stadium. The children attending the game each had parents who have been incarcerated for technical probation violations. As of 2019, Kraft has led 27 missions to Israel.

In 2020, Kraft partnered with Chinese company Tencent to purchase 1.2 million N95 masks to donate to medical workers in New York and Massachusetts to help combat the coronavirus pandemic, sending the New England Patriots' private team plane to China to pick up the supplies. Kraft initially negotiated for 1.7 million masks, but only 1.2 million fit on board. They were allowed three hours on the ground in China at Shenzhen Bao'an International Airport. The plane was used to deliver 500,000 vaccines to El Salvador in May 2021. Using the New England Patriots truck, they distributed 300,000 masks in New York City, 900,000 masks in Massachusetts and 100,000 in Rhode Island. In May 2020, Kraft put his Super Bowl LI ring up for auction with proceeds designated to help feed those facing food insecurity as a result of the COVID-19 pandemic.

Kraft lent the Patriots team plane to the University of Rhode Island Rams football team in October 2021 after the team's charter flight fell through. He covered all costs despite the URI Rams expecting to pay expenses through the team's budget.

In 2022, Harvard Business School announced the creation of the Robert K. Kraft Family Fellowship Fund, committing $24 million to benefit potential students with limited means to attend HBS.

Personal life
In June 1963, Kraft married Myra Nathalie Hiatt, a 1964 graduate of Brandeis University and the daughter of the late Worcester, Massachusetts, businessman and philanthropist Jacob Hiatt. She died due to ovarian cancer, aged 68, on July 20, 2011. The Krafts were members of Temple Emanuel in Newton, Massachusetts. A patch bearing Kraft's initials (MHK) appeared on the Patriots' uniform jersey throughout the 2011 season. The couple had four sons: Jonathan A. Kraft, Daniel A. Kraft, Joshua M. Kraft, and David H. Kraft.

In June 2012, Kraft began dating actress Ricki Noel Lander. Kraft and Lander broke up later in 2018.

Kraft was among 25 people facing first-degree misdemeanor charges for soliciting prostitution at a day spa in 2019. Kraft's attorney electronically entered a not-guilty plea, and later submitted a court filing where Kraft waived arraignment, plead not guilty to all charges and requested a jury trial. A memo filed by Kraft's attorneys revealed that hidden cameras had been installed when investigators entered the facility under the guise of a bomb threat. A Palm Beach County judge ruled that prosecutors could not use the videos in their case, citing privacy concerns. A Florida appeals court also ruled that Kraft's constitutional rights were violated, and all the charges were dropped. US District Judge Rodolfo Ruiz ordered the videos to be destroyed.

On March 5, 2022, an announcement was made by Tommy Hilfiger at the inaugural amfAR Gala Palm Beach event that Kraft and his partner, Dana Blumberg, had become engaged. On October 14, 2022, the couple married in New York City.

On October 30, 2022, the Foundation to Combat Antisemitism, which was founded by Kraft, sponsored an ad encouraging people to denounce hate against Jewish people.  The ad aired during NFL games and was titled ”Stand Up to Jewish Hate”. This action came in response to antisemitic comments made by Kanye West and later Kyrie Irving.

Awards and honors

Kraft has won various awards throughout his career in football, most notably becoming a six-time Super Bowl champion (as the owner of the Patriots: XXXVI, XXXVIII, XXXIX, XLIX, LI, LIII). In 2006, Kraft was awarded the NCAA's highest honor when he received the Theodore Roosevelt Award, "presented annually to a distinguished citizen of national reputation and outstanding accomplishments." Later in 2012, Kraft was a recipient of the George Halas Award.

Kraft has received honors from several colleges and universities. In 1987, Kraft received the John Jay Award from Columbia University. Columbia University later awarded Kraft in 2004 with the Alexander Hamilton Medal. In 2007, Columbia University's honored Kraft for his donation of US$5 million, renaming the playing field to Robert K. Kraft Field. In 2015, Kraft received an honorary doctorate in humane letters from Yeshiva University.

In the 2010's, Kraft was recognized for his lifetime achievements. In 2011, Kraft was inducted into the American Academy of Arts and Sciences. In 2013, Kraft was awarded the Carnegie Hall Medal of Excellence. In June 2019, Kraft received Israel's Genesis Prize Genesis Prize, a $1 million award given to an individual who is committed to Jewish values and is an inspiration to the next generation of Jews.

References

External links

New England Patriots biography
New England Revolution biography
The Kraft Group
Forbes 2011: The 400 Richest Americans: #263 Robert Kraft
Forbes 2008: The 500 Largest American Private Companies: #326 The Kraft Group
Forbes 2011: The World's Billionaires: #833 Robert Kraft

|-

|-

1941 births
Living people
American billionaires
American chief executives of professional sports organizations
American corporate directors
American financiers
American manufacturing businesspeople
American media executives
American people of Canadian descent
American philanthropists
American real estate businesspeople
American soccer chairmen and investors
Boston College people
Boston Uprising
Brookline High School alumni
Businesspeople from Boston
Carnegie Hall Medal of Excellence winners
Columbia College (New York) alumni
Columbia University people
Fellows of the American Academy of Arts and Sciences
Harvard Business School alumni
Jewish American philanthropists
Jewish American sportspeople
Kraft family
Major League Soccer executives
Major League Soccer owners
New England Patriots executives
New England Patriots owners
New England Revolution
People from Brookline, Massachusetts
People named in the Paradise Papers
Activists against antisemitism
Anti-BDS activists